Maximilian Kleber (born 29 January 1992) is a German professional basketball player for the Dallas Mavericks of the National Basketball Association (NBA). At 2.08 m (6 ft 10 in), he plays the power forward position.

Early life
Kleber played in the youth ranks of TG Veitshöchheim, SC Heuchelhof and TG Würzburg.

Professional career

Würzburg (2011–2014)
Kleber made his professional debut in Germany's top-flight Basketball Bundesliga during the 2011–12 season, representing the s.Oliver Baskets, a team based in his hometown Würzburg. In his first year, he was a role player on the team with an average of 7 minutes a game. In his second season, he grew to become an important player on the team, that averaged 9.9 points and 6.7 rebounds per game. In 2012, he declared for the NBA draft before removing his name from the list. He became auto-eligible for the NBA draft in 2014, but was not picked by any team.

Obradoiro (2014–2015)
In the 2014 off-season, he signed a two-year deal with Spanish club Obradoiro CAB. In the 2014–15 ACB season, he was named MVP of round 25 after scoring 36 points against Fuenlabrada. Kleber made 33 appearances in the league that year, averaging 11.5 points and 6.5 rebounds per game.

Bayern Munich (2015–2017)
On 1 July 2015, Kleber returned to Germany and signed a two-year deal with Bayern Munich. In 2015–16, he played 24 Bundesliga games for Bayern, including 17 starts, averaging 8.0 points and 4.9 boards per game. He appeared in 37 games (37 starts) during the 2016–17 Bundesliga season, supplying averages of 9.0 points, 5.3 rebounds and 1.8 assists per game.

Dallas Mavericks (2017–present)
On 13 July 2017, Kleber signed with the Dallas Mavericks. He made his NBA debut on 21 October 2017 against the Houston Rockets. Kleber moved from end of bench piece to key rotation player in his first few years, increasing his points, rebounds, assists and blocks per game numbers in each of his first three seasons. He was re-signed by the Mavericks on 10 July 2019. 

On 21 February 2020, Kleber scored a career high 26 points against the Orlando Magic in a 122–106 victory. In the 2019–20 season, Maxi posted a career high 9.1 points per game. He led the league in games played with 74 games and finished 19th in the league in blocks. Kleber played in his first playoffs that year against the 2nd seed LA Clippers. Kleber was tasked with guarding Kawhi Leonard for most of the series. Kleber struggled shooting the ball in the series, averaging 6.7 points per game and making just 5 of his 26 three-point attempts across the six game series. 

Kleber began the 2020–21 season strong, averaging 7.4 points per game and shooting 47.2% from three-point range in his first 9 games. Kleber would go on to miss the next 10 games however, as he recovered from COVID-19. Kleber would return to action 2 February 2021 against the Phoenix Suns. He logged 17 minutes of game play, grabbing 6 rebounds and scoring 2 points. Kleber and the Mavericks would go on to lose to the Los Angeles Clippers in the first round of the playoffs in 7 games.

On 18 April 2022, during Game 2 of the first round of the playoffs, Kleber scored 25 points and hit eight 3-pointers in a 110–104 win over the Utah Jazz. In the 2022 off-season, he signed a four-year contract extension with the Mavericks.

On 17 March 2023, Kleber made a buzzer-beating, game-winning three-pointer in a 111–110 win over the Los Angeles Lakers.

National team career
Kleber has also played games for the senior German national team. In 2014, he played for the team during the EuroBasket qualification rounds. Kleber was forced to sit out the 2020 Summer Olympics as he was recovering from an Achilles injury

NBA career statistics

Regular season

|-
| style="text-align:left;"| 
| style="text-align:left;"| Dallas
| 72 || 36 || 16.8 || .489 || .313 || .746 || 3.3 || .7 || .4 || .7 || 5.4
|-
| style="text-align:left;"| 
| style="text-align:left;"| Dallas
| 71 || 18 || 21.2 || .453 || .353 || .784 || 4.6 || 1.0 || .5 || 1.1 || 6.8
|-
| style="text-align:left;"| 
| style="text-align:left;"| Dallas
| style="background:#cfecec;"|74* || 21 || 25.5 || .461 || .373 || .849 || 5.2 || 1.2 || .3 || 1.1 || 9.1
|-
| style="text-align:left;"| 
| style="text-align:left;"| Dallas
| 50 || 40 || 26.8 || .422 || .410 || .919 || 5.2 || 1.4 || .5 || .7 || 7.1
|-
| style="text-align:left;"| 
| style="text-align:left;"| Dallas
| 59 || 21 || 24.6 || .398 || .325 || .728 || 5.9 || 1.2 || .5 || 1.0 || 7.0
|- class="sortbottom"
| style="text-align:center;" colspan="2"| Career
| 326 || 136 || 22.7 || .446 || .359 || .796 || 4.8 || 1.1 || .4 || .9 || 7.1

Playoffs

|-
| style="text-align:left;"| 
| style="text-align:left;"| Dallas
| 6 || 6 || 33.8 || .333 || .192 || .750 || 6.5 || 1.5 || .3 || 1.2 || 6.7
|-
| style="text-align:left;"| 
| style="text-align:left;"| Dallas
| 7 || 4 || 26.7 || .400 || .400 || .714 || 3.6 || 1.4 || .4 || .0 || 5.3
|-
| style="text-align:left;"| 
| style="text-align:left;"| Dallas
| 18 || 0 || 25.4 || .509 || .436 || .714 || 4.6 || 1.1 || .2 || .8 || 8.7
|- class="sortbottom"
| style="text-align:center;" colspan="2"| Career
| 31 || 10 || 27.3 || .451 || .379 || .725 || 4.7 || 1.3 || .3 || .7 || 7.5

References

External links

Maximilian Kleber at beko-bbl.de
Maximilian Kleber at draftexpress.com
Maximilian Kleber at eurobasket.com
Maximilian Kleber at euroleague.net
Maximilian Kleber at fiba.com

1992 births
Living people
2019 FIBA Basketball World Cup players
Dallas Mavericks players
FC Bayern Munich basketball players
German expatriate basketball people in Spain
German expatriate basketball people in the United States
German men's basketball players
Liga ACB players
National Basketball Association players from Germany
Obradoiro CAB players
Power forwards (basketball)
S.Oliver Würzburg players
Sportspeople from Würzburg
Undrafted National Basketball Association players